Igor Gal (born 20 January 1983) is a Croatian retired football defender.

External links

Igor Gal profile at HLSZ 

1983 births
Living people
Sportspeople from Koprivnica
Association football defenders
Croatian footballers
Croatia under-21 international footballers
NK Slaven Belupo players
HNK Hajduk Split players
Çaykur Rizespor footballers
KF Tirana players
Diósgyőri VTK players
Enosis Neon Paralimni FC players
FK Rabotnički players
Balmazújvárosi FC players
FC Koper players
Croatian Football League players
Süper Lig players
Nemzeti Bajnokság II players
Nemzeti Bajnokság I players
Cypriot First Division players
Macedonian First Football League players
Slovenian PrvaLiga players
Croatian expatriate footballers
Expatriate footballers in Turkey
Expatriate footballers in Albania
Expatriate footballers in Hungary
Expatriate footballers in Cyprus
Expatriate footballers in North Macedonia
Expatriate footballers in Slovenia
Croatian expatriate sportspeople in Turkey
Croatian expatriate sportspeople in Albania
Croatian expatriate sportspeople in Hungary
Croatian expatriate sportspeople in Cyprus
Croatian expatriate sportspeople in North Macedonia
Croatian expatriate sportspeople in Slovenia